= Northcountry Women's Coffeehouse =

Coordinates: 46.788311°N 92.097916°W

The Northcountry Women's Coffeehouse in Duluth, Minnesota first opened in 1981. First serving as a "safe space" for women, The Coffeehouse quickly became the center for women's culture, music, and social gatherings in Duluth.
